Narendra Damodardas Modi (born 17 September 1950) is an Indian politician serving as the 14th and current Prime Minister of India since 2014. Modi was the Chief Minister of Gujarat from 2001 to 2014 and is the Member of Parliament from Varanasi. He is a member of the Bharatiya Janata Party (BJP) and of the Rashtriya Swayamsevak Sangh (RSS), a right-wing Hindu nationalist paramilitary volunteer organisation. He is the longest serving prime minister from outside the Indian National Congress. 

Modi was born and raised in Vadnagar in northeastern Gujarat, where he completed his secondary education. He was introduced to the RSS at age eight. He has reminisced about helping out after school at his father's tea stall at the Vadnagar railway station. At age 18, Modi was married to Jashodaben Chimanlal Modi, whom he abandoned soon after. He first publicly acknowledged her as his wife more than four decades later when required to do so by Indian law, but has made no contact with her since. Modi has asserted he had travelled in northern India for two years after leaving his parental home, visiting a number of religious centres, but few details of his travels have emerged. Upon his return to Gujarat in 1971, he became a full-time worker for the RSS. After the state of emergency was declared by prime minister Indira Gandhi in 1975, Modi went into hiding. The RSS assigned him to the BJP in 1985 and he held several positions within the party hierarchy until 2001, rising to the rank of general secretary.

Modi was appointed Chief Minister of Gujarat in 2001 due to Keshubhai Patel's failing health and poor public image following the earthquake in Bhuj. Modi was elected to the legislative assembly soon after. His administration has been considered complicit in the 2002 Gujarat riots in which 1044 people were killed, three-quarters of whom were Muslim, or otherwise criticised for its management of the crisis. A Special Investigation Team appointed by the Supreme Court of India found no evidence to initiate prosecution proceedings against Modi personally. While his policies as chief minister—credited with encouraging economic growth—have received praise, his administration was criticised for failing to significantly improve health, poverty and education indices in the state.

Modi led the BJP in the 2014 general election which gave the party a majority in the lower house of Indian parliament, the Lok Sabha, the first time for any single party since 1984. Modi's administration has tried to raise foreign direct investment in the Indian economy and reduced spending on healthcare, education, and social welfare programmes. Modi centralised power by abolishing the Planning Commission and replacing it with the NITI Aayog. He began a high-profile sanitation campaign, controversially initiated a demonetisation of high-denomination banknotes and a transformation of the taxation regime, and weakened or abolished environmental and labour laws. He oversaw the country's response to the COVID-19 pandemic. As Prime Minister, Modi has received consistently high approval ratings.

Under Modi's tenure, India has experienced democratic backsliding. Following his party's victory in the 2019 general election, his administration revoked the special status of Jammu and Kashmir, introduced the Citizenship Amendment Act and three controversial farm laws, which prompted widespread protests and sit-ins across the country, resulting in a formal repeal of the latter. Described as engineering a political realignment towards right-wing politics, Modi remains a figure of controversy domestically and internationally over his Hindu nationalist beliefs and handling of the 2002 Gujarat riots, cited as evidence of a majoritarian and exclusionary social agenda.

Early life and education 
Narendra Damodardas Modi was born on 17 September 1950 to a Gujarati Hindu family of grocers in Vadnagar, Mehsana district, Bombay State (present-day Gujarat). He was the third of six children born to Damodardas Mulchand Modi and Hiraben Modi (1923–2022). Modi's family belonged to the Modh-Ghanchi-Teli (oil-presser) community, which is categorised as an Other Backward Class by the Indian government.

Modi had only infrequently spoken of his family background during his 13 years as chief minister of Gujarat. In the run up to the 2014 national elections, he began to regularly draw attention to his low-ranking social origins and to having to work as a child in his father's tea shop on the Vadnagar railway station platform, a description that the evidence of neighbours does not entirely corroborate. Modi completed his higher secondary education in Vadnagar in 1967, where teachers described him as an average student and a keen gifted debater, with interest in theatre. Modi preferred playing larger-than-life characters in theatrical productions, which has influenced his political image.

When eight years old, Modi was introduced to the Rashtriya Swayamsevak Sangh (RSS) and began attending its local shakhas (training sessions). There, Modi met Lakshmanrao Inamdar, popularly known as Vakil Saheb, who inducted him as a balswayamsevak (junior cadet) in the RSS and became his political mentor. While Modi was training with the RSS, he also met Vasant Gajendragadkar and Nathalal Jaghda, Bharatiya Jana Sangh leaders who were founding members of the BJP's Gujarat unit in 1980.

In a custom traditional to Narendra Modi's caste, his family arranged a betrothal to a girl, Jashodaben Chimanlal Modi, leading to their marriage when she was 17 and he was 18. Soon afterwards, he abandoned his bride, and left home, never divorcing her, but the marriage remaining unmentioned in Modi's public pronouncements for many decades. In April 2014, shortly before the national elections that swept him to power, Modi publicly affirmed that he was married and his spouse was Jashodaben; the couple has remained married, but estranged. Reportedly, their marriage was never consummated, and he kept it a secret because otherwise he could not have become a pracharak in the puritan Rashtriya Swayamsevak Sangh.

Modi spent the ensuing two years travelling across Northern and North-eastern India, though few details of where he went have emerged. In interviews, Modi has described visiting Hindu ashrams founded by Swami Vivekananda: the Belur Math near Kolkata, followed by the Advaita Ashrama in Almora and the Ramakrishna Mission in Rajkot. Modi remained only a short time at each, since he lacked the required college education. Vivekananda has been described as a large influence in Modi's life.

In the early summer of 1968, Modi reached the Belur Math but was turned away, after which Modi wandered through Calcutta, West Bengal and Assam, stopping in Siliguri and Guwahati. Modi then went to the Ramakrishna Ashram in Almora, where he was again rejected, before travelling back to Gujarat via Delhi and Rajasthan in 1968–69. Sometime in late 1969 or early 1970, Modi returned to Vadnagar for a brief visit before leaving again for Ahmedabad. There, Modi lived with his uncle, working in the latter's canteen at the Gujarat State Road Transport Corporation.

In Ahmedabad, Modi renewed his acquaintance with Inamdar, who was based at the Hedgewar Bhavan (RSS headquarters) in the city. Modi's first known political activity as an adult was in 1971 when he, as per his remarks, joined a Jana Sangh Satyagraha in Delhi led by Atal Bihari Vajpayee to enlist for the battlefield during the Bangladesh Liberation War. The Indira Gandhi-led central government disallowed open support for the Mukti Bahini, and Modi says he was put in Tihar Jail for a short period. After the Indo-Pakistani War of 1971, he stopped working for his uncle and became a full-time pracharak (campaigner) for the RSS, working under Inamdar. Shortly before the war, Modi took part in a non-violent protest against the Indian government in New Delhi, for which he was arrested (as per his claim); this has been cited as a reason for Inamdar electing to mentor him. Many years later Modi would co-author a biography of Inamdar, published in 2001. Modi's claim that he was part of a Satyagraha led to a political war. Applications were filed with the PMO under the RTI Act seeking details of his arrest. In reply, the PMO claimed that it maintains official records on Modi only since he took charge as the Prime Minister of India in 2014. Despite this claim, the official website of the PMO contains specific information about Modi which dates back to the 1950s.

In 1978 Modi received a Bachelor of Arts degree in political science from the School of Open Learning (SOL) at the University of Delhi, graduating with a third class. Five years later, in 1983, he received a Master of Arts degree in political science from Gujarat University, graduating with a first class as an external distance learning student. There is a controversy surrounding his educational qualification. Replying to an RTI query, the SOL said it did not have any data of students who received a BA degree in 1978. Jayantibhai Patel, a former political science professor of Gujarat University, claimed that the subjects listed in Modi's MA degree were not offered by the university when Modi was studying there.

Early political career 
In June 1975, Prime Minister Indira Gandhi declared a state of emergency in India which lasted until 1977. During this period, known as "the Emergency", many of her political opponents were jailed and opposition groups were banned. Modi was appointed general secretary of the "Gujarat Lok Sangharsh Samiti", an RSS committee co-ordinating opposition to the Emergency in Gujarat. Shortly afterwards, the RSS was banned. Modi was forced to go underground in Gujarat and frequently travelled in disguise to avoid arrest. He became involved in printing pamphlets opposing the government, sending them to Delhi and organising demonstrations. Modi was also involved with creating a network of safe houses for individuals wanted by the government, and in raising funds for political refugees and activists. During this period, Modi wrote a book in Gujarati, Sangharsh Ma Gujarat (In the Struggles of Gujarat), describing events during the Emergency. Among the people he met in this role was trade unionist and socialist activist George Fernandes, as well as several other national political figures. In his travels during the Emergency, Modi was often forced to move in disguise, once dressing as a monk, and once as a Sikh.

Modi became an RSS sambhag pracharak (regional organiser) in 1978, overseeing RSS activities in the areas of Surat and Vadodara, and in 1979 he went to work for the RSS in Delhi, where he was put to work researching and writing the RSS's version of the history of the Emergency. He returned to Gujarat a short while later, and was assigned by the RSS to the BJP in 1985. In 1987 Modi helped organise the BJP's campaign in the Ahmedabad municipal election, which the BJP won comfortably; Modi's planning has been described as the reason for that result by biographers. After L. K. Advani became president of the BJP in 1986, the RSS decided to place its members in important positions within the BJP; Modi's work during the Ahmedabad election led to his selection for this role, and Modi was elected organising secretary of the BJP's Gujarat unit later in 1987.

Modi rose within the party and was named a member of the BJP's National Election Committee in 1990, helping organise L. K. Advani's 1990 Ram Rath Yatra in 1990 and Murli Manohar Joshi's 1991–92 Ekta Yatra (Journey for Unity). However, he took a brief break from politics in 1992, instead establishing a school in Ahmedabad; friction with Shankersinh Vaghela, a BJP MP from Gujarat at the time, also played a part in this decision. Modi returned to electoral politics in 1994, partly at the insistence of Advani, and as party secretary, Modi's electoral strategy was considered central to the BJP victory in the 1995 state assembly elections. In November of that year Modi was appointed BJP national secretary and transferred to New Delhi, where he assumed responsibility for party activities in Haryana and Himachal Pradesh. The following year, Shankersinh Vaghela, a prominent BJP leader from Gujarat, defected to the Indian National Congress (Congress, INC) after losing his parliamentary seat in the Lok Sabha elections. Modi, on the selection committee for the 1998 Assembly elections in Gujarat, favoured supporters of BJP leader Keshubhai Patel over those supporting Vaghela to end factional division in the party. His strategy was credited as key to the BJP winning an overall majority in the 1998 elections, and Modi was promoted to BJP general secretary (organisation) in May of that year.

Chief Minister of Gujarat

Taking office 
In 2001, Keshubhai Patel's health was failing and the BJP lost a few state assembly seats in by-elections. Allegations of abuse of power, corruption and poor administration were made, and Patel's standing had been damaged by his administration's handling of the earthquake in Bhuj in 2001. The BJP national leadership sought a new candidate for the chief ministership, and Modi, who had expressed misgivings about Patel's administration, was chosen as a replacement. Although BJP leader L. K. Advani did not want to ostracise Patel and was concerned about Modi's lack of experience in government, Modi declined an offer to be Patel's deputy chief minister, telling Advani and Atal Bihari Vajpayee that he was "going to be fully responsible for Gujarat or not at all". On 3 October 2001 he replaced Patel as Chief Minister of Gujarat, with the responsibility of preparing the BJP for the December 2002 elections. Modi was sworn in as Chief Minister on 7 October 2001, and entered the Gujarat state legislature on 24 February 2002 by winning a by-election to the Rajkot – II constituency, defeating Ashwin Mehta of the INC.

2002 Gujarat riots 

On 27 February 2002, a train with several hundred passengers burned near Godhra, killing approximately 60 people. The train carried a large number of Hindu pilgrims returning from Ayodhya after a religious ceremony at the site of the demolished Babri Masjid. In making a public statement after the incident, Modi declared it a terrorist attack planned and orchestrated by local Muslims. The next day, the Vishwa Hindu Parishad called for a bandh across the state. Riots began during the bandh, and anti-Muslim violence spread through Gujarat. The government's decision to move the bodies of the train victims from Godhra to Ahmedabad further inflamed the violence. The state government stated later that 790 Muslims and 254 Hindus were killed. Independent sources put the death toll at over 2000, the vast majority Muslims Approximately 150,000 people were driven to refugee camps. Numerous women and children were among the victims; the violence included mass rapes and mutilations of women.

The government of Gujarat itself is generally considered by scholars to have been complicit in the riots, (with some blaming chief minister Modi explicitly) and has otherwise received heavy criticism for its handling of the situation. Several scholars have described the violence as a pogrom, while others have called it an example of state terrorism. Summarising academic views on the subject, Martha Nussbaum said: "There is by now a broad consensus that the Gujarat violence was a form of ethnic cleansing, that in many ways it was premeditated, and that it was carried out with the complicity of the state government and officers of the law." The Modi government imposed a curfew in 26 major cities, issued shoot-at-sight orders and called for the army to patrol the streets, but was unable to prevent the violence from escalating. The president of the state unit of the BJP expressed support for the bandh, despite such actions being illegal at the time. State officials later prevented riot victims from leaving the refugee camps, and the camps were often unable to meet the needs of those living there. Muslim victims of the riots were subject to further discrimination when the state government announced that compensation for Muslim victims would be half of that offered to Hindus, although this decision was later reversed after the issue was taken to court. During the riots, police officers often did not intervene in situations where they were able.

Modi's personal involvement in the 2002 events has continued to be debated. During the riots, Modi said that "What is happening is a chain of action and reaction." Later in 2002, Modi said the way in which he had handled the media was his only regret regarding the episode. In March 2008, the Supreme Court reopened several cases related to the 2002 riots, including that of the Gulbarg Society massacre, and established a Special Investigation Team (SIT) to look into the issue. In response to a petition from Zakia Jafri (widow of Ehsan Jafri, who was killed in the Gulbarg Society massacre), in April 2009 the court also asked the SIT to investigate the issue of Modi's complicity in the killings. The SIT questioned Modi in March 2010; in May, it presented to the court a report finding no evidence against him. In July 2011, the court-appointed amicus curiae Raju Ramachandran submitted his final report to the court. Contrary to the SIT's position, he said that Modi could be prosecuted based on the available evidence. The Supreme Court gave the matter to the magistrate's court. The SIT examined Ramachandran's report, and in March 2012 submitted its final report, asking for the case to be closed. Zakia Jafri filed a protest petition in response. In December 2013 the magistrate's court rejected the protest petition, accepting the SIT's finding that there was no evidence against the chief minister. In 2022, the Supreme Court dismissed a petition by Zakia Jafri wherein she challenged the clean chit given to the Modi in the riots by the Special Investigation Team, and upheld previous rulings that no evidence was found against him.

Later terms as Chief Minister 

In the aftermath of the violence there were widespread calls for Modi to resign as chief minister from within and outside the state, including from leaders of the Dravida Munnetra Kazhagam and the Telugu Desam Party (allies in the BJP-led National Democratic Alliance coalition), and opposition parties stalled Parliament over the issue. Modi submitted his resignation at the April 2002 BJP national executive meeting in Goa, but it was not accepted. Despite opposition from the election commissioner, who said that a number of voters were still displaced, Modi succeeded in advancing the election to December 2002. In the elections, the BJP won 127 seats in the 182-member assembly. Modi made significant use of anti-Muslim rhetoric during his campaign, and the BJP profited from religious polarisation among the voters. Modi framed the criticism of his government for human rights violations as an attack upon Gujarati pride, a strategy which led to the BJP winning two-thirds (127 of 182) of the seats in the state assembly. He won the Maninagar constituency, defeating INC candidate Yatin Oza. On 22 December 2002, Bhandari swore Modi in for a second term.

During Modi's second term the rhetoric of the government shifted from Hindutva to Gujarat's economic development. Modi curtailed the influence of Sangh Parivar organisations such as the Bharatiya Kisan Sangh (BKS) and the Vishva Hindu Parishad (VHP). When the BKS staged a farmers' demonstration Modi ordered their eviction from state-provided houses, and his decision to demolish 200 illegal temples in Gandhinagar deepened the rift with the Vishva Hindu Parishad. Nonetheless, Modi retained connections with some Hindu nationalists. Modi wrote a foreword to a 2014 textbook by Dinanath Batra, which stated that ancient India possessed technologies including test-tube babies.

Modi's relationship with Muslims continued to attract criticism. Prime Minister Atal Bihari Vajpayee distanced himself, reaching out to North Indian Muslims before the 2004 Lok Sabha elections. After the elections Vajpayee called the violence in Gujarat a reason for the BJP's electoral defeat and said it had been a mistake to leave Modi in office after the riots. Questions about Modi's relationship with Muslims were also raised by many Western nations. Modi was barred from entering the United States by the State Department, in accordance with the recommendations of the Commission on International Religious Freedom, the only person denied a US visa under this law. The UK and the European Union refused to admit him because of what they saw as his role in the riots. As Modi rose to prominence in India, the UK and the EU lifted their bans in October 2012 and March 2013, respectively, and after his election as Prime Minister in 2014, he was invited to Washington, D.C.

During the run-up to the 2007 Gujarat Legislative Assembly election and the 2009 Indian general election, the BJP intensified its rhetoric on terrorism. Modi criticised Prime Minister Manmohan Singh " for his reluctance to revive anti-terror legislation" such as the 2002 Prevention of Terrorism Act. In 2007 Modi authored Karmayog, a 101-page booklet discussing manual scavenging. In it, Modi argued that scavenging was a "spiritual experience" for Valmiks, a sub-caste of Dalits. However, this book was not circulated at that time because of the election code of conduct. After the November 2008 Mumbai attacks, the Gujarat government authorized the deployment of 30 high-speed boats for coastal surveillance. In July 2007 Modi completed 2,063 consecutive days as chief minister of Gujarat, making him the longest-serving holder of that post. The BJP won 122 of 182 state-assembly seats in that year's election.

Despite the BJP's shift away from explicit Hindutva, Modi's election campaign in 2007 and 2012 contained elements of Hindu nationalism. Modi only attended Hindu religious ceremonies, and had prominent associations with Hindu religious leaders. During his 2012 campaign he twice refused to wear articles of clothing gifted by Muslim leaders. He did, however, maintain relations with Dawoodi Bohra. His campaign included references to issues known to cause religious polarisation, including to Afzal Guru and the killing of Sohrabuddin Sheikh. The BJP did not nominate any Muslim candidates for the assembly election of 2012. During the 2012 campaign, Modi attempted to identify himself with the state of Gujarat, a strategy similar to that used by Indira Gandhi during the Emergency, and projected himself as protecting Gujarat against persecution by the rest of India. While campaigning for the 2012 Gujarat Legislative Assembly elections, Modi made extensive use of holograms and other technologies allowing him to reach a large number of people, something he would repeat in the 2014 general election. Modi won the constituency of Maninagar, defeating Shweta Bhatt of the INC. The BJP won 115 of the 182 seats, continuing its majority during his tenure. After his election as prime minister, Modi resigned as the chief minister and as an MLA from Maninagar. Anandiben Patel succeeded him as the chief minister.

Development projects 

As Chief Minister, Modi favoured privatisation and small government, which was at odds with the philosophy of the RSS, usually described as anti-privatisation and anti-globalisation. His policies during his second term have been credited with reducing corruption in the state. He established financial and technology parks in Gujarat and during the 2007 Vibrant Gujarat summit, real-estate investment deals worth  were signed.

The governments led by Patel and Modi supported NGOs and communities in the creation of groundwater-conservation projects. By December 2008, 500,000 structures had been built, of which 113,738 were check dams, which helped recharge the aquifers beneath them. Sixty of the 112 tehsils which had depleted the water table in 2004 had regained their normal groundwater levels by 2010. As a result, the state's production of genetically modified cotton increased to become the largest in India. The boom in cotton production and its semi-arid land use led to Gujarat's agricultural sector growing at an average rate of 9.6 percent from 2001 to 2007. Public irrigation measures in central and southern Gujarat, such as the Sardar Sarovar Dam, were less successful. The Sardar Sarovar project only irrigated 4–6% of the area intended. In 2008 Modi offered land in Gujarat to Tata Motors to set up a plant manufacturing the Nano after a popular agitation had forced the company to move out of West Bengal. Several other companies followed the Tata to Gujarat.

The Modi government finished the process of bringing electricity to every village in Gujarat that its predecessor had almost completed. Modi significantly changed the state's system of power distribution, greatly impacting farmers. Gujarat expanded the Jyotigram Yojana scheme, in which agricultural electricity was separated from other rural electricity; the agricultural electricity was rationed to fit scheduled irrigation demands, reducing its cost. Although early protests by farmers ended when those who benefited found that their electricity supply had stabilised, according to an assessment study corporations and large farmers benefited from the policy at the expense of small farmers and labourers.

Development debate 

A contentious debate surrounds the assessment of Gujarat's economic development during Modi's tenure as chief minister. The state's GDP growth rate averaged 10% during Modi's tenure, a value similar to other highly industrialised states, and above that of the country as a whole. Gujarat also had a high rate of economic growth in the 1990s, before Modi took office, and some scholars have stated that growth did not much accelerate during Modi's tenure. Under Modi, Gujarat topped the World Bank's "ease of doing business" rankings among Indian states for two consecutive years. In 2013, Gujarat was ranked first among Indian states for "economic freedom" by a report measuring governance, growth, citizens' rights and labour and business regulation among the country's 20 largest states. In the later years of Modi's government, Gujarat's economic growth was frequently used as an argument to counter allegations of communalism. Tax breaks for businesses were easier to obtain in Gujarat than in other states, as was land. Modi's policies to make Gujarat attractive for investment included the creation of Special Economic Zones, where labour laws were greatly weakened.

Despite its growth rate, Gujarat had a relatively poor record on human development, poverty relief, nutrition and education during Modi's tenure. In 2013, Gujarat ranked 13th in the country with respect to rates of poverty and 21st in education. Nearly 45 percent of children under five were underweight and 23 percent were undernourished, putting the state in the "alarming" category on the India State Hunger Index. A study by UNICEF and the Indian government found that Gujarat under Modi had a poor record with respect to immunisation in children.

Over the decade from 2001 to 2011, Gujarat did not change its position relative to the rest of the country with respect to poverty and female literacy, remaining near the median of the 29 Indian states. It showed a marginal improvement in rates of infant mortality, and its position with respect to individual consumption declined. With respect to the quality of education in government schools, the state ranked below many Indian states. The social policies of the government generally did not benefit Muslims, Dalits, and Adivasis, and generally increased social inequalities. Development in Gujarat was generally limited to the urban middle class, and citizens in rural areas or from lower castes were increasingly marginalised. In 2013 the state ranked 10th of 21 Indian states in the Human Development Index. Under Modi, the state government spent less than the national average on education and healthcare.

Premiership campaigns

2014 Indian general election 

In September 2013 Modi was named the BJP's candidate for prime minister ahead of the 2014 Lok Sabha election. Several BJP leaders expressed opposition to Modi's candidature, including BJP founding member L. K. Advani, who cited concern with leaders who were "concerned with their personal agendas". Modi played a dominant role in the BJP's election campaign. Several people who voted for the BJP stated that if Modi had not been the prime-ministerial candidate, they would have voted for another party. The focus on Modi as an individual was unusual for a BJP election campaign. The election was described as a referendum on Narendra Modi.

During the campaign, Modi focused on the corruption scandals under the previous INC government, and played on his image as a politician who had created a high rate of GDP growth in Gujarat. Modi projected himself as a person who could bring about "development", without focus on any specific policies. His message found support among young Indians and among middle-class citizens. The BJP under Modi was able to downplay concerns about the protection of religious minorities and Modi's commitment to secularism, areas in which he had previously received criticism. Prior to the election Modi's image in the media had centered around his role in the 2002 Gujarat riots, but during the campaign the BJP was able to shift this to a focus on Modi's neoliberal ideology and the Gujarat model of development. The BJP sought to identify itself with political leaders known to have opposed Hindu nationalism, including B. R. Ambedkar, Subhas Chandra Bose, and Ram Manohar Lohia. Hindutva remained a part of the campaign: BJP leaders used rhetoric based on Hindutva in several states. Communal tensions were played upon especially in Uttar Pradesh and the states of Northeast India. A proposal for the controversial Uniform Civil Code was a part of the BJP's election manifesto.
The BJP's campaign was assisted by its wide influence in the media. In addition to more conventional campaign methods, Modi made extensive use of social media, and addressed more than 1000 rallies via hologram appearances.

The BJP won 31% of the vote, and more than doubled its tally in the Lok Sabha to 282, becoming the first party to win a majority of seats on its own since 1984. Voter dissatisfaction with the INC, as well as with regional parties in North India, was another reason for the success of the BJP, as was the support from the RSS. In states such as Uttar Pradesh in which the BJP performed well, it drew exceptionally high support from upper-caste Hindus, although the 10 percent of Muslim votes won was more than it had won before. It performed particularly well in parts of the country that had recently experienced violence between Hindus and Muslims. The magnitude of the BJP's victory led many commentators to say that the election constituted a political realignment away from progressive parties and towards the right-wing. Modi's tweet announcing his victory was described as being emblematic of the political realignment away from a secular, socialist state towards capitalism and Hindu cultural nationalism.

Modi himself was a candidate for the Lok Sabha in two constituencies: Varanasi and Vadodara. He won in both constituencies, defeating Aam Aadmi Party leader Arvind Kejriwal in Varanasi by 371,784 votes and Madhusudan Mistry of the INC in Vadodara by  votes. Modi, who was unanimously elected leader of the BJP, was appointed prime minister by India's president. To comply with the law that an MP cannot represent more than one constituency, he vacated the Vadodara seat.

2019 Indian general election 

On 13 October 2018, Modi was named the BJP candidate for prime minister for the 2019 general election. The chief campaigner for the party was BJP's president Amit Shah. Modi launched the Main Bhi Chowkidar campaign ahead of the general election, against Chowkidar Chor Hai campaign slogan of INC. In 2018, the Telugu Desam Party split from the NDA over the matter of special status for Andhra Pradesh.

The campaign was started by Amit Shah on 8 April 2019. In the campaign, Modi was targeted by the opposition on corruption allegations over Rafale deal with France government. Highlighting this controversy the campaign "Chowkidar Chor Hai" was started, which was contrary to "Main Bhi Chowkidar" slogan. Modi made defence and national security among the foremost topics for the election campaign, especially after Pulwama attack, and the retaliatory attack of Balakot airstrike was counted as an achievement of the Modi administration. Other topics in the campaign were development and good foreign relations in the first premiership.

Modi contested the Lok Sabha elections as a candidate from Varanasi. He won the seat by defeating Shalini Yadav of the Samajwadi Party, who fought on SP-BSP alliance by a margin of  votes. Modi was unanimously appointed the prime minister for a second time by the National Democratic Alliance, after the alliance won the election for the second time by securing 353 seats in the Lok Sabha with the BJP alone won 303 seats.

Prime Minister 

After the Bharatiya Janata Party led National Democratic Alliance won a landslide in the 2014 Lok Sabha election, Modi was sworn in as the Prime Minister of India on 26 May 2014. He became the first Prime Minister born after India's independence from the British Empire in 1947. Modi started his second term after the National Democratic Alliance won again in the 2019 Lok Sabha election. On 6 December 2020, Modi became the 4th longest serving Prime Minister of India and the longest serving Non-Congress Prime Minister.

Governance and other initiatives 

Modi's first year as prime minister saw significant centralisation of power. Initially lacking a majority in the Rajya Sabha, or upper house of Indian Parliament, Modi passed a number of ordinances to enact his policies, leading to further centralisation of power. The government also passed a bill increasing the control that it had over the appointment of judges, and reducing that of the judiciary. In December 2014 Modi abolished the Planning Commission, replacing it with the National Institution for Transforming India, or NITI Aayog. The move had the effect of concentrating the power previously with the planning commission in the person of the prime minister. The planning commission had received heavy criticism in previous years for creating inefficiency in the government, and of not filling its role of improving social welfare: however, since the economic liberalisation of the 1990s, it had been the major government body responsible for measures related to social justice.

The Modi government launched investigations by the Intelligence Bureau against numerous civil society organisations and foreign non-governmental organisations in the first year of the administration. The investigations, on the grounds that these organisations were slowing economic growth, was criticised as a witch-hunt. International humanitarian aid organisation Medecins Sans Frontieres was among the groups that were put under pressure. Other organisations affected included the Sierra Club and Avaaz. Cases of sedition were filed against individuals criticising the government. This led to discontent within the BJP regarding Modi's style of functioning and drew comparisons to the governing style of Indira Gandhi.

Modi repealed 1,200 obsolete laws in first three years as prime minister; a total of 1,301 such laws had been repealed by previous governments over a span of 64 years. Modi also launched the Digital India programme, with the goal of ensuring that government services are available electronically, building infrastructure to provide high-speed Internet access to rural areas, boosting manufacturing of electronic goods in the country, and promoting digital literacy.

In 2019, a law was passed to reserve 10% of educational admission and government jobs for economically disadvantaged individuals. The Indian government launched the Ujjwala scheme in 2016 to provide free LPG connections to rural households. The scheme led to an additional 24% of Indian households having access to LPG in 2019 as compared to 2014. In 2022, the government eliminated subsidies for LPG for all citizens except those covered by the Ujjwala program.

Hindutva 

The activities of a number of Hindu nationalist organisations increased in scope after Modi's election as Prime Minister, sometimes with the support of the government. These activities included a Hindu religious conversion programme, a campaign against the alleged Islamic practice of "Love Jihad", and attempts to celebrate Nathuram Godse, the assassin of Mahatma Gandhi, by members of the right wing Hindu Mahasabha. Officials in the government, including the Home Minister, defended the conversion programmes.

Links between the BJP and the RSS grew stronger under Modi. The RSS provided organisational support to the BJP's electoral campaigns, while the Modi administration appointed a number of individuals affiliated with the RSS to prominent government positions. In 2014, Yellapragada Sudershan Rao, who had previously been associated with the RSS, became the chairperson of the Indian Council of Historical Research (ICHR). Historians and former members of the ICHR, including those sympathetic to the BJP, questioned his credentials as a historian, and stated that the appointment was part of an agenda of cultural nationalism. Over its first term the Modi administration appointed other RSS members to lead universities and research institutions, and recruitment of faculty members favoring the RSS increased. Scholars Nandini Sundar and Kiran Bhatty write that many of these appointees did not possess the qualifications for their positions. The Modi administration also made numerous changes in government-approved history textbooks. These changes de-emphasizing the role of Jawaharlal Nehru, and glorifying that of Modi himself, while also portraying Indian society as harmonious, without conflict or inequity.

The Modi administration passed a citizenship law in 2019 which provided a pathway to Indian citizenship for persecuted religious minorities from Afghanistan, Bangladesh and Pakistan who are Hindus, Sikhs, Buddhists, Jains, Parsis or Christians. The law does not grant such eligibility to Muslims. This was first time religion had been overtly used as a criterion for citizenship under Indian law: it attracted global criticism, and sparked widespread protests that were halted by the COVID-19 pandemic. Counter-demonstrations against the protests developed into the 2020 Delhi riots, caused chiefly by Hindu mobs attacking Muslims. Of the 53 people killed, two-thirds were Muslim. On 5 August 2020, Modi visited Ayodhya after the Supreme Court in 2019 ordered a contested land in Ayodhya to be handed over to a trust to build the Hindu temple and ordered the government to give alternate 5 acre land to Sunni Waqf Board for the purpose of building a mosque. He became the first prime minister to visit Ram Janmabhoomi and Hanuman Garhi.

Soon after Modi returned to power in 2019, he took three actions long called for by the RSS. The practice of Triple Talaq was made illegal, and a punishable act from 1 August 2019. The administration scrapped Article 370 of the Indian constitution, which granted autonomy to Jammu and Kashmir, and also abrogated its statehood, reorganizing it into two union territories, Jammu and Kashmir and Ladakh. The region was placed under a lockdown with internet services suspended: services were not completely restored until February 2021. Thousands of people, including hundreds of political leaders, were detained. The Supreme Court did not hear constitutional challenges to the reorganisation or the Citizenship Amendment Act: Bhatty and Sundar describe this as an example of the subversion of the Supreme Court and other major institutions, wherein they were filled with appointees favoring the BJP.

Economic policy 

The economic policies of Modi's government focused on privatisation and liberalisation of the economy, based on a neoliberal framework. Modi liberalised India's foreign direct investment policies, allowing more foreign investment in several industries, including in defence and the railways. Other proposed reforms included making it harder for workers to form unions and easier for employers to hire and fire them; some of these proposals were dropped after protests. The reforms drew strong opposition from unions: on 2 September 2015, eleven of the country's largest unions went on strike, including one affiliated with the BJP. The Bharatiya Mazdoor Sangh, a constituent of the Sangh Parivar, stated that the underlying motivation of labour reforms favoured corporations over labourers.

The funds dedicated to poverty reduction programmes and social welfare measures were greatly decreased by the Modi administration. The money spent on social programmes declined from 14.6% of GDP during the Congress government to 12.6% during Modi's first year in office, while spending on health and family welfare declined by 15%. The government also lowered corporate taxes, abolished the wealth tax, increased sales taxes, and reduced customs duties on gold, and jewellery. In October 2014, the Modi government deregulated diesel prices. Over Modi's first term, the government reduced spending on education as share of the budget: over five years, education spending dropped from 0.7% of GDP to 0.5%. The percentage of the budget spent on children's nutrition, education, health, and associated programs was reduced by nearly half by the Modi administration between 2014 and 2022. Capital expenditure on transport infrastructure has risen significantly under Modi, increasing from less than 0.4% of GDP in 2014 to 1.7% in 2023.

In September 2014, Modi introduced the Make in India initiative to encourage foreign companies to manufacture products in India, with the goal of turning the country into a global manufacturing hub. Supporters of economic liberalisation supported the initiative, while critics argued it would allow foreign corporations to capture a greater share of the Indian market. Modi's administration passed a land-reform bill that allowed it to acquire private agricultural land without conducting a social impact assessment, and without the consent of the farmers who owned it. The bill was passed via an executive order after it faced opposition in parliament, but was eventually allowed to lapse. Modi's government put in place the Goods and Services Tax, the biggest tax reform in the country since independence. It subsumed around 17 different taxes and became effective from 1 July 2017.

In his first cabinet decision, Modi set up a team to investigate black money. On 9 November 2016, the government demonetised ₹500 and ₹1000 banknotes, with the stated intention of curbing corruption, black money, the use of counterfeit currency, and terrorism. The move led to severe cash shortages, a steep decline in the Indian stock indices BSE SENSEX and NIFTY 50, and sparked widespread protests throughout the country. It is estimated that 1.5 million jobs were lost, and that 1% of the country's GDP was wiped out. Several deaths were linked to the rush to exchange cash. In the subsequent year, the number of income tax returns filed for individuals rose by 25%, and the number of digital transactions increased steeply.

Over the first four years of Modi's premiership, India's GDP grew at an average rate of 7.23%, higher than the rate of 6.39% under the previous government. The level of income inequality increased, while an internal government report said that in 2017, unemployment had increased to its highest level in 45 years. The loss of jobs was attributed to the 2016 demonetisation, and to the effects of the Goods and Services Tax. GDP growth was 6.12% in the 2018–19 FY, with an inflation rate of 3.4%. In the year 2019–20, the GDP growth rate slowed to 4.18%, while inflation increased to 4.7%. The Indian economy shrunk by 6.6% during the COVID-19 pandemic in 2020-2021, and was estimated to grow at 8.2% the following financial year.

Health and sanitation 

In his first year as prime minister, Modi reduced the amount of money spent by the central government on healthcare. The Modi government launched New Health Policy (NHP) in January 2015. The policy did not increase the government's spending on healthcare, instead emphasising the role of private healthcare organisations. This represented a shift away from the policy of the previous Congress government, which had supported programmes to assist public health goals, including reducing child and maternal mortality rates. The National Health Mission, which included public health programmes targeted at these indices received nearly 20% less funds in 2015 than in the previous year. The Modi administration reduced the healthcare budget by a further 15% in its second year. The healthcare budget for the following year rose by 19%. The budget was viewed positively by private insurance providers. Public health experts criticised its emphasis on the role of private healthcare providers, and suggested that it represented a shift away from public health facilities.

Modi emphasised his government's efforts at sanitation as a means of ensuring good health. On 2 October 2014, Modi launched the Swachh Bharat Mission ("Clean India") campaign. The stated goals of the campaign included eliminating open defecation and manual scavenging within five years. As part of the programme, the Indian government began constructing millions of toilets in rural areas and encouraging people to use them. The government also announced plans to build new sewage treatment plants. The administration plans to construct 60 million toilets by 2019. The construction projects have faced allegations of corruption, and have faced severe difficulty in getting people to use the toilets constructed for them. Sanitation cover in the country increased from 38.7% in October 2014 to 84.1% in May 2018; however, usage of the new sanitary facilities lagged behind the government's targets. In 2018, the World Health Organization stated that at least 180,000 diarrhoeal deaths were averted in rural India after the launch of the sanitation effort.

In response to the COVID-19 pandemic, the Modi administration invoked the Epidemic Diseases Act, 1897 and Disaster Management Act, 2005 in March 2020. All commercial domestic and international flights were suspended in March. Modi announced a 14 hour curfew on 22 March, followed by a three-week "total lockdown" two days later. Restrictions were gradually lifted beginning in April, and were completely revoked in November 2020. A second wave of the pandemic began in March 2021 was much more devastating than the first, with shortages of vaccines, hospital beds, oxygen cylinders and other medical supplies in parts of the country. In late April India reported over 400,000 cases in a 24-hour period, the first country to do so. India began its vaccination programme in January 2021; in January 2022, India announced that it administered about 1.7 billion doses of vaccines and more than 720 million people were fully vaccinated. In May 2022, the World Health Organization estimated that 4.7 million Indians had died of Covid-19 in India, mostly during the second wave in mid-2021. The figure was almost 10 times the Indian government's estimate. The Modi administration rejected the estimate.

Foreign policy 

Foreign policy played a small role in Modi's election campaign, and did not feature prominently in the BJP's election manifesto. Modi's foreign policy, similarly to that of the preceding Congress government, focused on improving economic ties, security, and regional relations. Modi continued Manmohan Singh's policy of "multi-alignment". The Modi administration tried to attract foreign investment in the Indian economy from several sources, especially in East Asia, with the use of slogans such as "Make in India" and "Digital India". The government also tried to improve relations with Islamic nations in the Middle East, such as Bahrain, Iran, Saudi Arabia, and the United Arab Emirates, as well as with Israel.

The foreign relations of India with the USA also mended after Narendra Modi became the Prime Minister. During the run-up to the general election there was wide-ranging scepticism regarding future of the strategic bilateral relation under Modi's premiership as in 2005 he was, while Chief Minister of Gujarat, denied a U.S. visa during the Bush administration for his poor human rights records. However sensing Modi's inevitable victory well before the election, the US Ambassador Nancy Powell had reached out to him as part of greater rapprochement from the west. Moreover, following his 2014 election as the Prime Minister of India, President Obama congratulated him over the telephone and invited him to visit the US. The Modi government was successful in forging good foreign relations with the USA in the presidencies of both Barack Obama and Donald Trump.

During the first few months after the election, Modi made trips to a number of different countries to further the goals of his policy, and attended the BRICS, ASEAN, and G20 summits. One of Modi's first visits as prime minister was to Nepal, during which he promised a billion USD in aid. Modi also made several overtures to the United States, including multiple visits to that country. While this was described as an unexpected development, due to the US having previously denied Modi a travel visa over his role during the 2002 Gujarat riots, the visits were expected to strengthen diplomatic and trade relations between the two countries.

In 2015, the Indian parliament ratified a land exchange deal with Bangladesh about the India–Bangladesh enclaves, which had been initiated by the government of Manmohan Singh. Modi's administration gave renewed attention to India's "Look East Policy", instituted in 1991. The policy was renamed the "Act East Policy", and involved directing Indian foreign policy towards East Asia and Southeast Asia. The government signed agreements to improve land connectivity with Myanmar, through the state of Manipur. This represented a break with India's historic engagement with Myanmar, which prioritised border security over trade. China–India relations have deteriorated rapidly following the 2020 China–India skirmishes. Modi has pledged aid of $900 million to Afghanistan, visited the nation twice and been honoured with the nation's highest civilian honour in 2016. He seems to have developed a strong personal relationship with Russian President Vladimir Putin.

Defence policy 

India's nominal military spending increased steadily under Modi. The military budget declined over Modi's tenure both as a fraction of GDP and when adjusted for inflation. A substantial portion of the military budget was devoted to personnel costs, leading commentators to write that the budget was constraining Indian military modernisation.

Modi promised to be "tough on Pakistan" during his election campaign, and repeatedly stated that Pakistan was an exporter of terrorism. On 29 September 2016, the Indian Army stated that it had conducted a surgical strike on terror launch pads in Azad Kashmir. The Indian media claimed that up to 50 terrorists and Pakistani soldiers had been killed in the strike. Pakistan initially denied that any strikes had taken place. Subsequent reports suggested that Indian claim about the scope of the strike and the number of casualties had been exaggerated, although cross-border strikes had been carried out. In February 2019, India carried out airstrikes in Pakistan against a supposed terrorist camp: no targets of significance were hit. Further military skirmishes followed, including cross-border shelling and the loss of an Indian aircraft.

Following his victory in 2019 Lok Sabha elections, he focused more on Defence policies of India, especially against China and Pakistan. On 5 May 2020, Chinese and Indian troops engaged in aggressive melee, face-offs and skirmishes at locations along the Sino-Indian border, including near the disputed Pangong Lake in Ladakh and the Tibet Autonomous Region, and near the border between Sikkim and the Tibet Autonomous Region. Additional clashes also took place at locations in eastern Ladakh along the Line of Actual Control (LAC). After which there was start of skirmishes between the nations leading to many border clashes, responses and reactions from both sides. A series of talks were also held between the two by both military and diplomatic means for peace. The first border clash reported in 2021 was on 20 January, referred to as a minor border clash in Sikkim.

Modi signed an agreement with Russian leader Vladimir Putin in December 2021 to extend military technical cooperation. The Modi government struck a deal with Russia, buying the S-400 missile system, an anti-missile striking system thereby constructing much stronger ties and relationship between the two nations. During the 2022 Russian invasion of Ukraine, India refused to condemn Russia's invasion and stayed neutral. The Indian government's 'Operation Ganga' initiative sought to bring back Indians stranded in Ukraine during the war. More than 19,000 nationals were evacuated, including from neighboring countries.

Environmental policy 

In naming his cabinet, Modi renamed the "Ministry of Environment and Forests" the "Ministry of Environment, Forests, and Climate Change". In his administration's first budget, the money allotted to this ministry was reduced by more than 50%. The new ministry removed or diluted a number of laws related to environmental protection, and others related to industrial activity. The government also tried to reconstitute the National Board for Wildlife such that it no longer had representatives from non-governmental organisations: however, this move was prevented by the Supreme Court. Other changes included reducing ministry oversight on small mining projects, and no longer requiring approval from tribal councils for projects inside forested areas. In addition, Modi lifted a moratorium on new industrial activity in the most polluted areas in the countries. The changes were welcomed by businesspeople, but criticised by environmentalists.

Speaking with Assamese students in 2014, Modi downplayed climate change, saying "Climate has not changed. We have changed. Our habits have changed. Our habits have got spoiled. Due to that, we have destroyed our entire environment." However, over the years he has been vocal for climate action, especially with proliferating clean energy. Modi in 2015 proposed the International Solar Alliance initiative to encourage investment into solar energy. Holding developed countries responsible, Modi and his government have reiterated that India has had a negligible historical role in climate change. At the COP26 conference Modi announced that India would target carbon neutrality by 2070, and also expand its renewable energy capacity. Indian environmentalists and economists applauded the decision, describing it as a bold climate action. India has emerged as the only major economy to be on track to meet Paris Agreement goals. It has achieved 10% ethanol blending five months ahead of schedule.

Democratic backsliding 
Under Modi's tenure, India has experienced democratic backsliding. According to one study, "The BJP government incrementally but systemically attacked nearly all existing mechanisms that are in place to hold the political executive to account, either by ensuring that these mechanisms became subservient to the political executive or were captured by party loyalists." The Modi government has used state power to intimidate and stifle critics in the media and academia, thus undermining freedom of expression and alternative sources of information. The Modi administration has been described as using a democratic mandate to undermine democratic processes, including by focusing on Hindu-nationalist priorities rather than economic development. Modi's second term as prime minister, in particular, saw the erosion of civil rights, and of press freedom.

Public perception and image 
Modi has received consistently high approval ratings during his tenure; he is often ranked in popular opinion polls as the greatest prime minister in Indian history.

Image 
A vegetarian and teetotaler, Modi has a frugal lifestyle and is a workaholic and introvert. A person named Badri Meena has been his cook since 2002. Modi used to maintain a close and publicised relationship with his centenarian mother, Hiraben. Modi's 31 August 2012 post on Google Hangouts made him the first Indian politician to interact with citizens on a live chat. Modi has also been called a fashion-icon for his signature crisply ironed, half-sleeved kurta, as well as for a suit with his name embroidered repeatedly in the pinstripes that he wore during a state visit by US President Barack Obama, which drew public and media attention and criticism. Modi's personality has been variously described by scholars and biographers as energetic, arrogant, and charismatic.

He had published a Gujarati book titled Jyotipunj in 2008, containing profiles of various RSS leaders. The longest was of M. S. Golwalkar, under whose leadership the RSS expanded and whom Modi refers to as Pujniya Shri Guruji ("Guru worthy of worship"). According to The Economic Times, his intention was to explain the workings of the RSS to his readers and to reassure RSS members that he remained ideologically aligned with them. Modi authored eight other books, mostly containing short stories for children.

The nomination of Modi for the prime ministership drew attention to his reputation as "one of contemporary India's most controversial and divisive politicians." During the 2014 election campaign the BJP projected an image of Modi as a strong, masculine leader, who would be able to take difficult decisions. Campaigns in which he has participated have focused on Modi as an individual, in a manner unusual for the BJP and RSS. Modi has relied upon his reputation as a politician able to bring about economic growth and "development". Nonetheless, his role in the 2002 Gujarat riots continues to attract criticism and controversy. Modi's hardline Hindutva philosophy and the policies adopted by his government continue to draw criticism, and have been seen as evidence of a majoritarian and exclusionary social agenda.

Approval ratings 

As a Prime Minister, Modi has received consistently high approval ratings; at the end of his first year in office, he received an overall approval rating of 87% in a Pew Research poll, with 68% of people rating him "very favorably" and 93% approving of his government. His approval rating remained largely consistent at around 74% through his second year in office, according to a nationwide poll conducted by instaVaani. At the end of his second year in office, an updated Pew Research poll showed Modi continued to receive high overall approval ratings of 81%, with 57% of those polled rating him "very favorably". At the end of his third year in office, a further Pew Research poll showed Modi with an overall approval rating of 88%, his highest yet, with 69% of people polled rating him "very favorably". A poll conducted by The Times of India in May 2017 showed 77% of the respondents rated Modi as "very good" and "good". In early 2017, a survey from Pew Research Center showed Modi to be the most popular figure in Indian politics. In a weekly analysis by Morning Consult called the Global Leader Approval Rating Tracker, Modi had the highest net approval rating as of 22 December 2020 of all government leaders in the 13 countries being tracked.

In popular culture 

Modi Kaka Ka Gaon (Modi uncle's town), a 2017 Indian Hindi-language drama film by Tushar Amrish Goel, is the first biopic about Modi. It starred Vikas Mahante in the titular role. PM Narendra Modi, a 2019 Hindi-language biographical drama film by Omung Kumar, starred Vivek Oberoi in the titular role and covers his rise to prime ministership. An Indian web series, Modi: Journey of a Common Man, based on the same premise released in May 2019 on Eros Now with Ashish Sharma portraying Modi.

7 RCR (7, Race Course Road), a 2014 Indian docudrama political television series which charts the political careers of prominent Indian politicians, covered Modi's rise to the PM's office in the episodes "Story of Narendra Modi from 1950 to 2001", "Story of Narendra Modi in Controversial Years from 2001 to 2013", "Truth Behind Brand Modi", "Election Journey of Narendra Modi to 7 RCR", and "Masterplan of Narendra Modi's NDA Govt."; with Sangam Rai in the role of Modi. India: The Modi Question, a 2023 BBC documentary, examined Modi's role in the 2002 Gujarat riots and Modi's track record as Prime Minister. The documentary was banned by the Indian government to widespread criticism. 

Other portrayals of Modi include those by Rajit Kapur in the film Uri: The Surgical Strike (2019) and Vikram Gokhale in the web-television series Avrodh: The Siege Within (2020), both based on the 2016 Uri attack and the subsequent Indian surgical strikes. Gokhale reprised the role in the sequel Avrodh: The Siege Within 2 (2022), which is based on the 2016 Indian banknote demonetisation. Pratap Singh played a character based on Modi in Chand Bujh Gaya (2005) which is set in the backdrop of the Gujarat riots.

Modi appeared in an episode of Discovery Channel's show Man vs Wild with the host Bear Grylls, becoming the second world leader after Barack Obama to appear in the reality show. In the show he trekked the jungles and talked about nature and wildlife conservation with Grylls. The episode was shot in Jim Corbett National Park, Uttarakhand and was broadcast in 180 countries along with India. Modi hosts Mann Ki Baat, a monthly radio programme, on All India Radio, and has conducted Pariksha Pe Charcha — a competition and discussion for students and the issues they face in examinations.

Awards and recognition 
In March 2012 and June 2014, Modi appeared on the cover of the Asian edition of Time Magazine, one of the few Indian politicians to have done so. He was awarded Indian of the Year by CNN-News18 (formally CNN-IBN) news network in 2014. In June 2015, Modi was featured on the cover of Time Magazine. In 2014, 2015, 2017, 2020 and 2021, he was named one of Time magazine's 100 Most Influential People in the World. Forbes Magazine ranked him the 15th Most Powerful Person in the World in 2014 and the 9th Most Powerful Person in the World in 2015, 2016 and 2018. In 2015, Modi was ranked the 13th Most Influential Person in the World by Bloomberg Markets Magazine. In 2021 Time called him the third "pivotal leader" of independent India after Jawaharlal Nehru and Indira Gandhi who "dominated the country's politics like no one since them". Modi was ranked fifth on Fortune Magazines first annual list of the "World's Greatest Leaders" in 2015. In 2017, Gallup International Association (GIA) conducted a poll and ranked Modi as third top leader of the world. In 2016, a wax statue of Modi was unveiled at Madame Tussauds wax museum in London.

In 2015 he was named one of Times "30 Most Influential People on the Internet" as the second-most-followed politician on Twitter and Facebook. In 2018, he was the third most followed world leader on Twitter, and the most followed world leader on Facebook and Instagram. In October 2018, Modi received United Nations's highest environmental award, the 'Champions of the Earth', for policy leadership by "pioneering work in championing" the International Solar Alliance and "new areas of levels of cooperation on environmental action". He was conferred the 2018 Seoul Peace Prize in recognition of "his dedication to improving international co-operation, raising global economic growth, accelerating the Human Development of the people of India by fostering economic growth and furthering the development of democracy through anti-corruption and social integration efforts". He is the first Indian to win the award.

Following his second swearing-in ceremony as Prime Minister of India, a picture of Modi was displayed on the facade of the ADNOC building in Abu Dhabi, United Arab Emirates. The Texas India Forum hosted a community event in honour of Modi on 22 September 2019 at the NRG Stadium in Houston, Texas. The event was attended by over 50,000 people and several American politicians including President Donald Trump, making it the largest gathering for an invited foreign leader visiting the United States other than the Pope. At the same event, Modi was presented with the Key to the City of Houston by Mayor Sylvester Turner. He was awarded the Global Goalkeeper Award on 24 September 2019 in New York City by the Bill & Melinda Gates Foundation in recognition for the Swachh Bharat Mission and "the progress India has made in providing safe sanitation under his leadership".

In 2020, Modi was among eight world leaders awarded the parodic Ig Nobel Prize in Medical Education "for using the COVID-19 viral pandemic to teach the world that politicians can have a more immediate effect on life and death than scientists and doctors can". On 21 December 2020, President Donald Trump awarded Modi with the Legion of Merit for elevating the India–United States relations. The Legion of Merit was awarded to Modi along with Prime Minister of Australia Scott Morrison and former Prime Minister of Japan Shinzo Abe, the "original architects" of the QUAD. On 24 February 2021, the largest cricket stadium in the world at Ahmedabad was renamed Narendra Modi Stadium by the Gujarat Cricket Association.

State honours

Electoral history

Bibliography

See also 
 List of prime ministers of India
 Opinion polling on the Narendra Modi premiership

References

Notes

Citations

Bibliography

External links 

 
 
 
 
 
 
 
 
 

|-

|-

|-

|-

|-

|-

|-

|-

Narendra Modi
1950 births
Living people
Gujarati people
People from Gujarat
People from Mehsana district
Indian Hindus
Prime Ministers of India
Leaders of the Lok Sabha
Chief Ministers of Gujarat
Chief ministers from Bharatiya Janata Party
India MPs 2014–2019
India MPs 2019–present
Delhi University alumni
Gujarat University alumni
Rashtriya Swayamsevak Sangh pracharaks
Indian nationalists
Indian writers
Recipients of the Legion of Merit
Recipients of Grand Collar of the State of Palestine
Hindu nationalists
Right-wing politics in India
20th-century Indian writers
Members of the Planning Commission of India
Right-wing populism in India
Bharatiya Jana Sangh politicians
Bharatiya Janata Party politicians from Gujarat
Lok Sabha members from Gujarat
Lok Sabha members from Uttar Pradesh
National Democratic Alliance candidates in the 2019 Indian general election
Writers from Gujarat
Candidates in the 2014 Indian general election
Hindu pacifists
Narendra Modi ministry
Candidates in the 2019 Indian general election
Hindu revivalists
Writers about activism and social change
Indian political people
21st-century prime ministers of India
Gujarat MLAs 1998–2002
Politicians of Hindu political parties
National Democratic Alliance candidates in the 2014 Indian general election
Indian anti-communists
Gujarat MLAs 2002–2007
Gujarat MLAs 2007–2012
Gujarat MLAs 2012–2017
21st-century Indian non-fiction writers
Politicians from Varanasi
Gandhians
Rashtriya Swayamsevak Sangh members